The 1982 Avon Championships were the eleventh WTA Tour Championships, the annual women's tennis tournament for the best players of the 11 tournament Avon Championships Circuit on the 1982 WTA Tour. It was the 11th edition of the event and was played from March 24 through March 28, 1982 on indoor carpet courts at the Madison Square Garden in New York City, United States. Fifth-seeded Sylvia Hanika won the singles title, after trailing Navratilova 1–6, 1–3 in the final, and earned $100,000 first-prize money.

Champions

Singles

 Sylvia Hanika defeated  Martina Navratilova, 1–6, 6–3, 6–4
 It was Hanika's 1st singles title of the year and the 4th of her career.

Doubles

 Martina Navratilova and  Pam Shriver defeated  Kathy Jordan and  Anne Smith, 6–4, 6–3

See also
 1982 Toyota Series Championships

References

External links
 
 ITF tournament edition details
 Tournament draws

WTA Tour Championships
Avon Championships
Avon Championships
Avon Championships
1980s in Manhattan
Avon Championships
Madison Square Garden
Sports competitions in New York City
Sports in Manhattan
Tennis tournaments in New York City